Christian Eichner (born 24 November 1982) is a German former professional football defender who is the current manager of Karlsruher SC.

Coaching record

References

External links

1982 births
Living people
German footballers
MSV Duisburg players
Karlsruher SC players
Karlsruher SC II players
TSG 1899 Hoffenheim players
1. FC Köln players
Association football defenders
Bundesliga players
2. Bundesliga players
3. Liga players
People from Sinsheim
Sportspeople from Karlsruhe (region)
Karlsruher SC managers
2. Bundesliga managers
3. Liga managers
Footballers from Baden-Württemberg
German football managers